Discography of Brazilian pop singer Marjorie Estiano.

Discography

Studio Albums

DVDs

2005: Marjorie Estiano e Banda Ao Vivo (Marjorie Estiano and Band Live)
2006: Casa da Bossa (Bossa's Home) (Various artists compilation)
2006: Roupa Nova's  RoupAcústico 2 (feat. Marjorie on Flagra)
2007: Cidade do Samba (City of Samba) (Various artists compilation)

Singles

Promo singles

 So Easy
 Versos Mudos (released to a few radios) 
 As Horas

Soundtracks 

{| class="wikitable"
!align="left"|Year
!align="left"|Song
!align="left"|Soundtrack
|-
|align="left"|2004
|align="left"|"Você Sempre Será", "Por Mais Que Eu Tente", "Reflexo do Amor", "Versos Mudos"
|align="left"|Malhação Nacional 2004
|-
|align="left"|2005
|align="left"|"So Easy", "As Horas"
|align="left"|Malhação Nacional 2005
|-
|align="left"|2005
|align="left"|"Esqueça (Forget Him)"
|align="left"|As Favoritas do Domingão do Faustão: Românticas (The Favorites from Domingão do Faustão: Romantic)
|-
|align="left"|2006
|align="left"|"Wave (Vou Te Contar)"
|align="left"|Casa da Bossa (Bossa's Home)
|-
|align="left"|2006
|align="left"|"Flagra" feat. Roupa Nova
|align="left"|Roupa Nova's RoupAcústico 2
|-
|align="left"|2006
|align="left"|"Espirais (Remix)"
|align="left"|Pé na Jaca
|-
|align="left"|2006
|align="left"|"Sob Nova Direção'''s Theme" 
|align="left"|Sob Nova Direção|-
|align="left"|2006
|align="left"|"O Que Tiver Que Ser" 
|align="left"|Malhação Nacional 2006|-
|align="left"|2007
|align="left"|"O Rap da Gaginha" feat. Ingrid Guimarães
|align="left"|Sob Nova Direção|-
|align="left"|2007
|align="left"|"Chiclete com Banana" feat. Gilberto Gil
|align="left"|Cidade do Samba (City of Samba)|-
|align="left"|2007
|align="left"|"Tatuagem" 
|align="left"|Malhação Nacional 2007|-
|}

Tours

2005-2006: Marjorie Estiano e Banda Ao Vivo2007-2008: Turnê Bláblabla'2009-2010: Combinação Sobre Todas as Coisas2011: TBA''

Videos

References 

Estiano, Marjorie
Discographies of Brazilian artists
Latin music discographies